Millat (Gujarati: મિલ્લત,) or Daily Millat is a bilingual Gujarati and Urdu daily founded in 1948 by Fakhre Matari and based in Karachi, Sindh, Pakistan. After him his son Inquilab Matari managed the newspaper. It is edited by Shumaila Matari Daud.

It is one of the two Gujarati newspapers published from Karachi; other is Watan.

Editor-in-chiefs
 Fakhre Matri (1948–1966)
 Inquilab Matri (1966–2010)
 Shumaila Matri (2010–present)

See also 
 List of newspapers in Pakistan

References

External links
The Daily Millat (Gujarati version)
The Daily Millat (Urdu Version)
Millat Official Site
Millat-a-ibraheem Official Site

Gujarati-language newspapers
Urdu-language newspapers published in Pakistan
Daily newspapers published in Pakistan
Bilingual newspapers
Mass media in Karachi
Newspapers established in 1946